The Government of Illinois, under Illinois' Constitution, has three branches of government: Executive, Legislative, and Judicial. The State's executive branch is split into several statewide elected offices, with the Governor as chief executive and head of state, and has numerous departments, agencies, boards and commissions. Legislative functions are granted to the General Assembly, a bicameral body consisting of the 118-member House of Representatives and the 59-member Senate. The judiciary is composed of the Supreme Court of Illinois and lower courts.

Executive
The executive branch is composed of six elected officers and their offices, as well as numerous other departments. Illinois is one of 26 states that elect their governor on the same ticket as their lieutenant governor. The six elected officers are:

Departments

The government of Illinois has numerous departments, agencies, boards and commissions; however, the code departments, so called because they are established by the Civil Administrative Code of Illinois, provide most of the state's services:

 Department on Aging
 Department of Agriculture
 Department of Central Management Services
 Department of Children and Family Services 
 Department of Commerce and Economic Opportunity
 Department of Corrections
 Emergency Management Agency
 Department of Employment Security
 Department of Financial and Professional Regulation
 Department of Healthcare and Family Services
 Department of Human Rights
 Department of Human Services
 Department of Juvenile Justice
 Department of Labor
 Department of the Lottery
 Department of Natural Resources
 Department of Public Health
 Department of Revenue
 Department of State Police
 Department of Transportation
 Department of Veterans' Affairs

Former Lt. Governor and Attorney General Neil Hartigan currently serves as General Counsel to The Governor of Illinois (J.B. Pritzker). Regulations are codified in the Illinois Administrative Code. The Illinois Register is the weekly publication containing proposed and adopted rules.

Legislature

The Illinois General Assembly is the state legislature, composed of the 118-member Illinois House of Representatives and the 59-member Illinois Senate. The members of the General Assembly are elected at the beginning of each even-numbered year. Representatives elect from their chamber a Speaker and Speaker pro tempore, and senators elect from the chamber a President of the Senate.

The Governor has different types of vetoes, such as a full veto, reduction veto, and an amendatory veto, but the General Assembly has the power to override gubernatorial vetoes through a three-fifths majority vote of each chamber. The General Assembly's session laws are published in the official Laws of Illinois. The Illinois Compiled Statutes (ILCS) are the codified statutes of a general and permanent nature.

Judiciary

The Supreme Court has limited original jurisdiction and has final appellate jurisdiction. It has mandatory jurisdiction in capital cases and cases where the constitutionality of laws has been called into question, and has discretionary jurisdiction from the Appellate Court. The Appellate Court is the court of first appeal for civil and criminal cases rising in the Illinois circuit courts.

The circuit courts are trial courts of original jurisdiction. There are 24 judicial circuits in the state, each comprising one or more of Illinois' 102 counties. The circuit court has general jurisdiction and can decide, with few exceptions, any kind of case.

Capital city
Springfield is designated as the Illinois capital. Many State of Illinois bureaucrats work in offices in Springfield, and it is the regular meeting place of the Illinois General Assembly. All persons elected in a statewide manner in Illinois are required to have at least one residence in Springfield, and the state government funds these residences.

, none of the major constitutional officers in Illinois designated Springfield as their primary residence. Most cabinet officers and all major constitutional officers conduct most of their business in Chicago. A former director of the Southern Illinois University Paul Simon Institute for Public Affairs, Mike Lawrence, stated that many of the elected officials in Illinois "spend so little time in Springfield". In 2012, St. Louis Post-Dispatch columnist Pat Gauen argued that "in the reality of Illinois politics, [Springfield] shares de facto capital status with Chicago." Gauen noted that then-Governor Pat Quinn was a Chicago resident who spent only 68 days and 40 nights in Springfield from March 2011 to March 2012, per his official schedule. Gauen added that state attorney general Lisa Madigan, state House speaker Michael Madigan, House minority leader Tom Cross, state Senate president John Cullerton, Senate minority leader Christine Radogno, state Comptroller Judy Baar Topinka, and state Treasurer Dan Rutherford, all lived in the Chicago metropolitan area and worked in the James R. Thompson Center in Chicago. According to Gauen, "Everybody who's anybody in Illinois government has an office in Chicago." University of Illinois researcher and former member of the Illinois legislature Jim Nowlan stated "It’s almost like Chicago is becoming the shadow capital of Illinois" and that "Springfield is almost become a hinterland outpost." Lawrence criticized the fact that state officials spent little time in Springfield since it estranged them from and devalued Illinois state employees based in that city.

In 2007, Illinois state representative Raymond Poe criticized Illinois agency heads who commute to Springfield with state financing while maintaining their primary residences in the Chicago area. He sponsored House Bill 1959, which proposed ending state financing for travel to Springfield.

According to Gauen, "Illinois seems rather unlikely to move its official capital to Chicago".

Local government

The administrative divisions of Illinois are the counties, townships, precincts, cities, towns, villages, and special-purpose districts. Illinois has more units of local government than any other state—over 8,000 in all. The basic subdivision of Illinois are the 102 counties. 85 of the 102 counties are in turn divided into townships and precincts. Municipal governments are the cities, villages, and incorporated towns. Some localities possess "home rule", which allows them to govern themselves to a certain extent. Illinois counties, townships, cities, and villages may promulgate local ordinances. Illinois also has several types of school districts (including the Chicago Public Schools and the Illinois Community College System) and additional units of government that oversee many other functions.

See also
 Elections in Illinois
 Illinois Budget Impasse
 Law enforcement in Illinois
 Law of Illinois
 Politics of Illinois

References

External links
 
 Illinois Data Portal
 State of Illinois recipient profile on USAspending.gov

 
Illinois